Emma Lennartsson (born 23 April 1991) is a Swedish football midfielder who plays for Linköpings playing in Sweden's Damallsvenskan.

Honours 
Linköpings FC
Winner
 Damallsvenskan: 2016, 2017
 Svenska Cupen (2): 2013–14, 2014–15

Runner-up
 Svenska Supercupen: 2015

Personal life 
Lennartsson lives with her partner Norwegian footballer Frida Maanum.

References

External links 
 
 Emma Lennartsson at Linköpings FC

1991 births
Living people
Swedish women's footballers
Linköpings FC players
Damallsvenskan players
Women's association football midfielders
Sportspeople from Norrköping
Footballers from Östergötland County
Swedish LGBT sportspeople
LGBT association football players
Lesbian sportswomen
21st-century LGBT people